Pakhar is a village in the Kisko CD block in the Lohardaga Sadar subdivision of the Lohardaga district in the Indian state of Jharkhand.

Geography

Location
Pakhar is located at

Area overview
The map alongside shows an undulating plateau area with the hilly tract in the west and north-west. Three Bauxite mining centres are marked. It is an overwhelmingly rural district with 87.6% of the population living in the rural areas.

Note: The map alongside presents some of the notable locations in the district. All places marked in the map are linked in the larger full screen map.

Demographics
According to the 2011 Census of India, Pakhar had a total population of 2,134, of which 1,117 (52%) were males and 1,017 (48%) were females. Population in the age range 0–6 years was 501. The total number of literate persons in Pakhar was 552 (33.80% of the population over 6 years).

(*For language details see Kisko block#Language and religion)

Bauxite mines
Lohardaga district has large reserves of world class bauxite across Pakhar,  Hisari, Rudhali Pat, Khamar Pat.

Minerals & Minerals Ltd., a subsidiary of Hindalco, operates the 109.507 hectares  Pakahar Bauxite Mining Project.

References

Villages in Lohardaga district
Mining communities in Jharkhand